Edward Herbert, 3rd Baron Herbert of Chirbury (died 1678) was an English aristocrat and soldier.

Life
He was the elder son of Richard Herbert, 2nd Baron Herbert of Chirbury. He joined the royalist uprising under Sir George Booth, when he declared for Charles II in Cheshire in 1659, and suffered a short imprisonment. After the Restoration he was made custos rotulorum of Montgomeryshire (24 August 1660), and Denbighshire (1666).

Richard Davies a Quaker, of Welshpool in Montgomeryshire, often appealed to Herbert in behalf of coreligionists committed to prison; and Herbert was sympathetic. He was, Davies says, a very big fat man.

Herbert corresponded frequently with his great-uncle, Sir Henry Herbert. He died 9 December 1678, and was buried in St Edmund's Chapel, Westminster Abbey. He built a half timbered mansion in Lymore Park, which was completed in 1677, the year before his death. Lymore lies to the east-southeast of Montgomery, and the house was largely demolished in 1931

Family
Herbert married firstly Anne, daughter of Sir Thomas Myddelton of Chirk Castle, and secondly, Elizabeth, daughter of George Brydges, 6th Baron Chandos, but had no issue.

References

Attribution

3
17th-century births
1678 deaths
Myddelton family
Edward
Year of birth missing